The National Basketball Association (NBA) is a professional basketball league with teams in the United States and Canada. Nearly every team, with one exception, has a squad of dancers for cheerleading that are usually involved in dancing, charity work, fundraisers, and modeling. However, the #MeToo Movement has resulted in many NBA teams replacing their all-girl dance teams with family-friendly hype teams in recent years.

Teams

The only team currently without traditional NBA dancers is the San Antonio Spurs. Until 2018, they had a dance squad called the Silver Dancers.

Notable NBA cheerleaders

Atlanta Hawks
Deneen Graham (1994) – Miss North Carolina 1983
Kaylin Reque (2008–11) – Miss Georgia USA 2011
Laurie Flynn – wife of Matt Schaub

Boston Celtics
Michelle Leonardo (2013–present) -Miss New Jersey USA 2012

Chicago Bulls
Shanon Lersch (2004–09) – Miss Illinois USA 2008
Ashley Bond (2007–13) – Miss Illinois USA 2009

Dallas Mavericks
Cindy Villarreal (1989–90) – choreographer 
Kandi Harris (2004–05) – fiancee of Hunter Mahan
Jill Marie Jones – actress, Toni on Girlfriends

Denver Nuggets
Lindsey Kovacevich (2005–07) -anchor and reporter of KVAL-TV

Detroit Pistons
Cassandra Ferguson – contestant on The Bachelor season 18
Heather Zara – traffic reporter of WDIV-TV

Golden State Warriors
Bonnie-Jill Laflin (1992–94) – model, actress, television personality

Houston Rockets
Natalie Alvarado (1997–2004) – singer and dance team director of the Minnesota Timberwolves
Casey Potter (2016-2018) director of the Houston Texans Cheerleaders

Indiana Pacers
Angela Sparrow (2006–07) – Miss Illinois USA 2011
Jocelyn Peck (2013–present) – wife of Stanley Havili

Los Angeles Clippers
Eve Torres (2006–07) – wrestler
Jocelyn Peck (2010–12) – wife of Stanley Havili

Los Angeles Lakers
Paula Abdul (1980s) – singer, dancer, choreographer, television personality
Tina Landon (1980s) – dancer, choreographer
Emily Harper (2000–03) – actress
Cindy Leos (2000–01) - dancer, choreographer, celebrity trainer
Sandra Colton (2002–03) – dancer, author
Taylour Paige (2010) – dancer, actress
Leah Van Dale (2010–11) – WWE wrestler
Natasha Martinez (2011–12) – Miss California USA 2015
Moon Bloodgood – model, actress
Vanessa Curry – singer

Memphis Grizzlies
Stacey Tookey – dancer, choreographer

Miami Heat
Jessica Sutta (1999–2002) – singer, dancer, actress, member of the pop girl group Pussycat Doll
Trista Rehn (2000–02) – contestant on The Bachelor season 1
Jenni Croft (2005–06) – contestant on The Bachelor season 11
Layla El (2004–06) – model, dancer, actress, wrestler
Hennely Jimenez (2006–07) – Actress, starred in the film 200 mph
Kristina Akra – reporter for Fox Sports South
Traci Young-Byron – (8 Year Vet) MTV's America's Best Dance Crew Season 3 Lifetime's Bring it Set it up

Milwaukee Bucks
Tanya Fischer (2003–04) – Actress of The Defenders
Bishara Dorre (2008–11) – Miss Wisconsin USA 2014

Minnesota Timberwolves
Brittany Thelemann – Miss Minnesota USA 2011

New Jersey/Brooklyn Nets
Denise Garvey (1999–2000) – former Dallas Cowboys Cheerleader, former New York Knicks dancer, director of the New York Jets Flight Crew

New Orleans Hornets
Dawn Richard – singer, dancer, former member of Danity Kane

New York Knicks
Heather Van Arsdel (1998–2005) – WPTZ news anchor
Denise Garvey (2001–05) – former Dallas Cowboys Cheerleader, former New Jersey Nets dancer, director of the New York Jets Flight Crew
Asia Nitollano (2006–07) – singer, dancer, former Pussycat Doll
Amanda Grace (2008) – director of the New Jersey Devils Ice Dancers
Sarah Mitchell – dancer, actress
Sydney Lotuaco (2015–18) – Contestant of The Bachelor season 23

Oklahoma City Thunder
Kimberly Sullivan (2008–09) – contestant on The Bachelor season 14
Ali Dudek – singer (during the team's Seattle days)

Orlando Magic
 Megan Clementi (2003–08) – Miss Florida USA 2010
 Trinity McCray – WWE wrestler
 Sandy Fox (1988–91) – Voice actress

Philadelphia 76ers
Amber-Joi Watkins (2005–07) – Miss Pennsylvania USA 2011

Phoenix Suns
Brittany Bell (2006–09) – Miss Arizona USA 2010
Jenni Croft (2006–09) – contestant on The Bachelor season 11
Kat Hurd (2013–present) – contestant on The Bachelor season 18
Tiffany Dunn – singer

Portland Trail Blazers
Caysie Torrey (1997–98) – dancer, actress, clothing model
Shannon Bex (1999–2004) – singer, dancer, former member of Danity Kane

Sacramento Kings
Vanessa Born (2001–03) – actress and dancer
Aubrey Aquino – TV reporter and host

Toronto Raptors
Nicole Arbour - YouTube comedian and provocateur
Nikki Grant (2007–09) – actress

Utah Jazz
Tiffany Coyne (2000–02) – Co-host and model on Let's Make a Deal on CBS
Jocelyn Peck (2007–10) – wife of Stanley Havili
Jessica Sanchez – morning traffic reporter of WKMG-TV

See also

National Football League Cheerleading

References

External links

Atlanta Hawks A-Town Dancers Official Site
Boston Celtics Dancers Official Site
Brooklyn Nets Brooklynettes Official Site
Charlotte Honey Bees Official Site
Chicago Bulls Luvabulls Official Site
Cleveland Cavaliers Cavalier Girls Official Site
Dallas Mavericks Mavs Dancers Official Site
Denver Nuggets Dancers Official Site
Detroit Pistons Automotion Official Site
Golden State Warrior Girls Official Site
Houston Rockets Power Dancers Official Site
Indiana Pacers Pacemates Official Site
Los Angeles Clippers Spirit Dancers Official Site
Los Angeles Lakers Laker Girls Official Site
Memphis Grizzlies Grizz Girls Official Site

Miami Heat HEAT Dancers Official Site
Milwaukee Bucks Energee! Dancers Official Site
Minnesota Timberwolves Dancers Official Site
New Orleans Pelicans Dance Team Official Site
New York Knicks City Dancers Official Site
Oklahoma City Thunder Girls Official Site
Orlando Magic Dancers Official Site
Philadelphia 76ers Dance Team Official Site
Phoenix Suns Dancers Official Site
Portland Trail Blazers BlazerDancers Official Site
Sacramento Kings Dancers Official Site
San Antonio Spurs Silver Dancers Official Site
Toronto Raptors Dance Pak Official Site
Utah Jazz Dancers Official Site
Washington Wizards Wizard Girls Official Site

 
National Basketball Association cheerleading squads